Duwa Lashi La is a Burmese politician and lawyer of Kachin descent, and is the president of the Kachin National Consultative Council.

He was named by the Committee Representing Pyidaungsu Hluttaw, on 16 April 2021, as the vice-president in the National Unity Government of Myanmar, a parallel government to the State Administrative Council formed after the 2021 coup.

On 7 September 2021, Duwa Lashi La announced that from today the defensive war against the military junta has been launched — urges the citizens to revolt against the junta in every corner of the country.

Early life and education
He was born in the village of Mung Ji in northern Shan State. He graduated from Lashio High School with a B grade and worked as a teacher at his hometown, Mongji School. After working as a teacher, he re-entered the tenth grade at St. Michael's School in Maymyo.  In 1970, he studied law at Yangon University.

He received his BA in 1974. In 1976, he regained his L.L.B. After graduation, he worked as a prosecutor in Myitkyina and Lashio for two years. He then worked as a law officer for 16 years from 1978 to 1994.

2021 coup and acting president of the NUG

Duwa Lashi La was appointed vice president and acting president after a meeting between the Committee Representing Pyidaungsu Hluttaw (CRPH) and the Kachin Political Interim Coordination Team (KPICT). According to the Irrawaddy, during the meeting, Duwa Lashi La argued that the detained vice president Henry Van Thio should be replaced because “We are making the revolution to bring down tyranny and build a new era, it is good not to include people who were involved in the military, and instead better to choose those with a vision of reform towards democracy and federalism.” the CRPH agreed and asked Duwa Lashi La to take the position, a position that Duwa Lashi La accepted.

References

External links
 

Burmese politicians
Year of birth missing (living people)
Living people
Burmese people of Kachin descent
People from Shan State
University of Yangon alumni